Daniel McKelvie (born 6 June 1980) is a Scottish footballer who played 'senior' for Clydebank and Dumbarton.

References

1980 births
Scottish footballers
Dumbarton F.C. players
Clydebank F.C. (1965) players
Scottish Football League players
Living people
Footballers from Paisley, Renfrewshire
Association football forwards